Welsh dishes as a whole are generally associated with simplicity. Welsh cookery is thought to be similar to English cuisine in style. There are few written records of Welsh foods, recipes were instead held within families and passed down orally between the women of the family.  Those with the skills and inclination to write Welsh recipes, the upper classes, conformed to English styles and therefore would not have run their houses with traditional Welsh cuisine. Despite being poorly recorded, the traditional cookery of Wales does exist. It finds its roots in the day to day meals of peasant folk, unlike other cultures where the meals would start in the kitchens of the gentry and would be adapted for poorer plates.

Welsh dishes

References

Bibliography 

Welsh cuisine